Bradley G. Pieper (born June 16, 1942) was an American businessman and politician.

Pieper was born in Minneapolis, Minnesota and went to the Minneapolis public schools and to University of Minnesota. He lived in Burnsville, Minnesota with his wife and family and was the owner of an exterminating business. Pieper served in the Minnesota House of Representatives in 1973 and 1974 and was a Republican.

References

1942 births
Living people
Businesspeople from Minneapolis
Politicians from Minneapolis
People from Burnsville, Minnesota
Republican Party members of the Minnesota House of Representatives